is a Japanese actor who was formerly represented by the talent agency, Cast Power. He graduated from Osaka Prefectural Nozaki High School and Osaka University of Arts.

Biography
In 1980, Kinoshita auditioned for the film, Gaki Teikoku, which he passed and made his acting debut. After graduating from Osaka University of Arts, he entered Yoshimoto Kogyo and joined Yoshimoto Shinkigeki troupe, but he did little to stand out on the comedy stage, and quit after three years. In 1989, Kinoshita moved to Tokyo at the request of director Kazuyuki Izutsu and became one of the popular by-players in Japanese cinema. He later moved to Cast Power in 2011. Kinoshita's hobby is riding a bike, and his skills are kick-boxing and karate.

Sexual assault allegations
In March 2022, three actresses came forward that Kinoshita sexually assaulted and abused them in 2011. Hideo Sakaki, a close friend of Kinoshita who had appeared in several of Sakaki's films, was accused by four actresses of similar allegations. The victims allege that Kinoshita and Sakaki collaborated in sexual coercion by introducing young women to each other that were looking to break into the film industry. Shortly after the allegations surfaced, Kinoshita released a statement stating that "there are some differences from the facts" and that he does not remember certain events from ten years ago. However, he added that the events are "generally correct" and proceeded to apologize to the victims and others who were "deeply injured" by his actions; he also indefinitely cease his "entertainment activities." Kinoshita was dropped by his management Cactus.

Filmography

TV series

Film

References

External links
 
 Houka Kinoshita at Wiki informer

Japanese male actors
1964 births
Living people
People from Daitō, Osaka
Zainichi Korean people